Tagliente is a surname. Notable people with the surname include:

 Giovanni Antonio Tagliente, (c. 1460s – c. 1528), Italian author and publisher
 Gina Tagliente (born 1965), American guitarist, better known as Gina Stile
 Carla Tagliente (born 1979), American field hockey player
 The Tagliente family, American owners of the company Tage Inn

Italian-language surnames